General Friedrich Kühn (7 August 1889 – 15 February 1944) was a General der Panzertruppe in the Wehrmacht during World War II. He was a recipient of the Knight's Cross of the Iron Cross of Nazi Germany.

World War II
At the start of World War II, Kühn was in command of a tank training school near Berlin, where he had been since 10 November 1938. On 10 February 1940, he took command of the 3rd Panzer Brigade under 3rd Panzer Division, which he led into the Battle of France. On 1 July 1940, he was promoted to Generalmajor. Kühn and his soldiers played a key part in the second stage of the battle, Fall Rot, when they were able to penetrate the French Weygand line on the first day of the offensive to a depth of 15 kilometers, destroyed fourteen artillery batteries and paved the way for the exploitation of the breakthrough. For his decisive leadership on that day Kühn would later be awarded the Knight's Cross on 4 July 1940.  In September 1940 he briefly held command of the 3rd Panzer Division in place of its commander Horst Stumpff, who returned to take command on 4 October 1940, and Kühn was appointed commander of the 33rd Infantry Division on 5 October 1940. The 33rd Infantry Division became the 15th Panzer Division on 11 November 1940, with Kühn keeping this command. On 22 March 1941 he traded command of 15th Panzer Division with Generalleutnant Heinrich von Prittwitz und Gaffron, and took command of 14th Panzer Division, which he led into the Invasion of Yugoslavia.

Kühn and the 14th Panzer Division participated in Operation Barbarossa as part of 1st Panzer Group under Army Group South, crossing into Russia near Ustyluh on 20 June 1941. The division captured Lutsk on 26 June 1941, reached Rivne by 1 July, and Bila Tserkva by 23 July 1941. The division turned south and drove through Uman on to Kirovohrad, which fell on 5 August 1941. Kühn then led the division through Kryvyi Rih to participate in the fight for Dnipropetrovsk, which lasted until 10 September 1941. The division then turned south and participated in the Battle of Rostov (1941), before spending the winter in defensive positions around the Mius River.

In 1942, Kühn and his division were ordered to assist in the counter-offensive against Russian forces in the Izyum area, which is where the unit was located until the middle of May 1942. On 22 April 1942, Kühn was awarded the German Cross in Gold. During the Second Battle of Kharkov, the division was ordered to relocate to Stalino, which is where it was located at the end of June 1942. On 30 June 1942, Kühn gave up the 14th Panzer Division, and on 1 July 1942, he was promoted to Generalleutnant. On 10 September 1942 he was appointed General of Army Mechanization at the OKH. On 23 February 1943, per orders directly from Adolf Hitler, he was put in charge of all motorization matters for all of the Wehrmacht. On 1 April 1943 he was promoted to General der Panzertruppe. On 15 February 1944, he was killed in a Berlin air raid at the Hotel Bristol.

References

Citations

Bibliography

 
 
 
 
 
 
 
 

1889 births
1944 deaths
People from Eutin
Generals of Panzer Troops
German Army personnel of World War I
Recipients of the Knight's Cross of the Iron Cross
Recipients of the Gold German Cross
People from the Province of Schleswig-Holstein
German Army personnel killed in World War II
Recipients of the clasp to the Iron Cross, 1st class
Reichswehr personnel
Deaths by airstrike during World War II
Military personnel from Schleswig-Holstein
German Army generals of World War II